Naoto Hirooka, better known as h.NAOTO (born 1977) is a Japanese avant-garde fashion designer. H. Naoto's style of clothing and accessories could be classified under Japanese punk and Gothic Lolita, and he has been called the "most visible and successful of the labels fixated on that style."

Biography
He graduated from Bunka Fashion College in Tokyo, joined S-inc. in 1999, and launched his own brand, h.NAOTO in the Spring/Summer of 2000.

H. Naoto created a dress worn by Amy Lee of Evanescence at the 2004 Grammy Awards.  He has also designed costumes for the bands Ayabie, Psycho le Cému (for the Prism PV), Gackt, S.K.I.N., Marbell, and Hangry & Angry.

References

External links
H. Naoto's Official Site

1977 births
Living people
Japanese fashion designers
Lolita fashion